Ripley is both a surname and a unisex given name.

People bearing it include:

Given name 
 Ripley P. Bullen (1902–1976), American archaeologist and academic
 Ripley Hitchcock (1857–1918), American editor
 Ripley Parker (born 2000), daughter of Thandie Newton and Oliver Parker
 Ripley Rand (born c. 1970), American jurist

Surname 
Alexandra Ripley (1934–2004), American writer
Alice Ripley (born 1963), American actress
Allen Ripley (born 1952), American baseball player
Amanda Ripley, American journalist and author
Andy Ripley (footballer) (born 1975), English footballer
Andy Ripley (born 1947), English rugby player
Arthur Ripley (1897–1961), American screenwriter
Brian Ripley (born 1952), British statistician
Dorothy Ripley (1767–1832), British missionary
Edward H. Ripley (1829–1915), American general and businessman
Edward Payson Ripley (1845–1920), American railroad executive
Eleazer Wheelock Ripley (1782–1839), American general and politician
Fay Ripley (born 1966), British actress
George Ripley (alchemist) (ca. 1415–1490), English alchemist
George Ripley (transcendentalist) (1802–1880), American social reformer
Gladys Ripley (1908–1955), British singer
Heather Ripley (born 1959), actress
Sir Henry William Ripley (1813-1882), British politician and philanthropist
Henry A. Ripley (1842–1926), American politician
Henry J. Ripley (1798–1875), biblical scholar
James Wolfe Ripley (1794–1870), American general
John Ripley (1867–1933), British soldier
John Ripley (USMC) (1939–2008), American Marine
Lynn Ripley (1948–2015), birth name of English singer-songwriter Twinkle
Martha Ripley (1843–1912), American physician
Robert Ripley (1890–1949), American entrepreneur, amateur anthropologist
Roswell Ripley (1823–1887), American general
Sarah Bradford Ripley (1793–1867), American scholar
Sidney Dillon Ripley (1913–2001), American ornithologist 
Steve Ripley (1950–2019), American singer-songwriter, frontman of the country rock band The Tractors
Stuart Ripley (born 1967), English football player
Thomas Ripley (architect) (1686–1758), English architect
William Z. Ripley (1867–1941), American economist and racial theorist

Fictional characters
Cyd Ripley, from Best Friends Whenever
Amanda Ripley, the daughter of Ellen Ripley in the Alien film series and the protagonist of the video game Alien: Isolation
Ellen Ripley, the protagonist of the Alien film series
Justin Ripley, a Detective Sargeant and John Luther's loyal right-hand man in the television series Luther
The Ripley, fictional alien viruses in Stephen King's novel and film Dreamcatcher
Tom Ripley, in The Talented Mr. Ripley and other novels and films
Sailor Ripley, ex-con lead from the film 'Wild at Heart' by David Lynch

Anthropomorphized things
 SpaceX Ripley, the instrumented mannequin aboard the first ISS space station SpaceX Crew Dragon space capsule test flight Crew Dragon Demo-1

English-language unisex given names